Singapore's iPhone Film Festival was started by DS Media for aspiring filmmakers. This film festival was designed to give film makers an avenue to show off their film making skills to the world by simply using their talents, creativity, and their iPhone.

References

IPhone
Film festivals in Singapore